Untouchable Lovers is a 2018 Chinese television series based on the novel Feng Qiu Huang (A Tale of Two Phoenixes) by Tianyi Youfeng (天衣有风). The series is produced by Yu Zheng and stars Guan Xiaotong and Song Weilong. It aired on Hunan TV from January 14 to April 16, 2018.
Untouchable Lovers has a 3.6 rating on Douban from over 41,000 users.

Synopsis
Tianji Tower, the leading organisation of the pugilistic world is determined to overthrow the tyrannical ruler Liu Ziye. To achieve their mission, Tianji Tower replaces the king's sister Liu Chuyu with their own disciple and Princess-lookalike Zhu Que. Zhu Que meets the Princess' learned companion Rong Zhi, who turns out to be a spy from Northern Wei. Liu Chuyu and Rong Zhi's relationship eventually breaks down over misunderstandings and differing loyalties, and the latter fakes his death in order to regain Chuyu's forgiveness.

In an alternate story, Chuyu is sent to marry Northern Wei's Prince regent, Rong Zhi.

Cast

Main

Supporting

Liu Song dynasty

People in Princess Manor

Royal family

Officials and servants

Northern Wei

Royal family

Officials and servants

Others

Soundtrack

Ratings

International broadcast

References

Chinese historical television series
Chinese romance television series
2018 Chinese television series debuts
Television shows based on Chinese novels
Television shows written by Yu Zheng
Hunan Television dramas
Television series by Huanyu Film
Television series by Cathay Media
2018 Chinese television series endings
Love stories